Sandra Birch Lee Suk-yee (born 9 March 1952) was the Permanent Secretary for Health, Welfare and Food in the Hong Kong Government.

As such she and Stella Hung, the Permanent Secretary for Food and Health (Food), are the civil service counterparts to the Secretary for Food and Health, York Chow.

Lee was appointed Secretary for Economic Services in 2000. Since the Principal Officials Accountability System was introduced in 2002, she has served as Permanent Secretary for Economic Development (2004)and Labour (Economic Development) (until 2006).

She became core member of former Financial Secretary John Tsang's campaign team in the 2017 Chief Executive election.

See also
Hong Kong Civil Service

References

1952 births
Hong Kong civil servants
Living people